Kimi to Boku may refer to:
Kimi to Boku (manga), a manga by Kiichi Hotta
Everlasting Heart, an original net animation and a live-action film